"Mash It Up", or alternative title "Fuck Shit Up" (sometimes stylized "F*@k S#*t Up") is a song by Canadian artist Karl Wolf from his 2012 album Finally Free. It was produced by Greg Stainer and UnderGround Procedures (UGP), and released in 2011 as the second single from the album Finally Free and a follow-up of the initial single "Ghetto Love". The single was released in two titles, "Fuck Shit Up" and the "clean" radio-friendly version "Mash It Up".

Charts
The single reached #28 on the Billboard Canadian Hot 100 and was certified gold on March 26, 2012.

References

2011 singles
Karl Wolf songs
2011 songs
Universal Republic Records singles